Specific modulus is a materials property consisting of the elastic modulus per mass density of a material. It is also known as the stiffness to weight ratio or specific stiffness. High specific modulus materials find wide application in aerospace applications where minimum structural weight is required. The dimensional analysis yields units of distance squared per time squared. The equation can be written as:

 

The utility of specific modulus is to find materials which will produce structures with minimum weight, when the primary design limitation is deflection or physical deformation, rather than load at breaking—this is also known as a "stiffness-driven" structure. Many common structures are stiffness-driven over much of their use, such as airplane wings, bridges, masts, and bicycle frames.

To emphasize the point, consider the issue of choosing a material for building an airplane.  Aluminum seems obvious because it is "lighter" than steel, but steel is stronger than aluminum, so one could imagine using thinner steel components to save weight without sacrificing (tensile) strength.  The problem with this idea is that there would be a significant sacrifice of stiffness, allowing, e.g., wings to flex unacceptably.  Because it is stiffness, not tensile strength, that drives this kind of decision for airplanes, we say that they are stiffness-driven.

The connection details of such structures may be more sensitive to strength (rather than stiffness) issues due to effects of stress risers.

Specific modulus is not to be confused with specific strength, a term that compares strength to density.

Applications

Specific stiffness in tension 

The use of specific stiffness in tension applications is straightforward.  Both stiffness in tension and total mass for a given length are directly proportional to cross-sectional area.  Thus performance of a beam in tension will depend on Young's modulus divided by density.

Specific stiffness in buckling and bending 

Specific stiffness can be used in the design of beams subject to bending or Euler buckling, since bending and buckling are stiffness-driven.  However, the role that density plays changes depending on the problem's constraints.

Beam with fixed dimensions; goal is weight reduction 

Examining the formulas for buckling and deflection, we see that the force required to achieve a given deflection or to achieve buckling depends directly on Young's modulus.

Examining the density formula, we see that the mass of a beam depends directly on the density.

Thus if a beam's cross-sectional dimensions are constrained and weight reduction is the primary goal, performance of the beam will depend on Young's modulus divided by density.

Beam with fixed weight; goal is increased stiffness 

By contrast, if a beam's weight is fixed, its cross-sectional dimensions are unconstrained, and increased stiffness is the primary goal, the performance of the beam will depend on Young's modulus divided by either density squared or cubed.  This is because a beam's overall stiffness, and thus its resistance to Euler buckling when subjected to an axial load and to deflection when subjected to a bending moment, is directly proportional to both the Young's modulus of the beam's material and the second moment of area (area moment of inertia) of the beam.

Comparing the list of area moments of inertia with formulas for area gives the appropriate relationship for beams of various configurations.

Beam's cross-sectional area increases in two dimensions 

Consider a beam whose cross-sectional area increases in two dimensions, e.g. a solid round beam or a solid square beam.

By combining the area and density formulas, we can see that the radius of this beam will vary with approximately the inverse of the square of the density for a given mass.

By examining the formulas for area moment of inertia, we can see that the stiffness of this beam will vary approximately as the fourth power of the radius.

Thus the second moment of area will vary approximately as the inverse of the density squared, and performance of the beam will depend on Young's modulus divided by density squared.

Beam's cross-sectional area increases in one dimension 

Consider a beam whose cross-sectional area increases in one dimension, e.g. a thin-walled round beam or a rectangular beam whose height but not width is varied.

By combining the area and density formulas, we can see that the radius or height of this beam will vary with approximately the inverse of the density for a given mass.

By examining the formulas for area moment of inertia, we can see that the stiffness of this beam will vary approximately as the third power of the radius or height.

Thus the second moment of area will vary approximately as the inverse of the cube of the density, and performance of the beam will depend on Young's modulus divided by density cubed.

However, caution must be exercised in using this metric.  Thin-walled beams are ultimately limited by local buckling and lateral-torsional buckling.  These buckling modes depend on material properties other than stiffness and density, so the stiffness-over-density-cubed metric is at best a starting point for analysis.  For example, most wood species score better than most metals on this metric, but many metals can be formed into useful beams with much thinner walls than could be achieved with wood, given wood's greater vulnerability to local buckling.  The performance of thin-walled beams can also be greatly modified by relatively minor variations in geometry such as flanges and stiffeners.

Stiffness versus strength in bending 

Note that the ultimate strength of a beam in bending depends on the ultimate strength of its material and its section modulus, not its stiffness and second moment of area.  Its deflection, however, and thus its resistance to Euler buckling, will depend on these two latter values.

Approximate specific stiffness for various materials

See also
 Specific strength

References

Materials science